U.S. Route 360 (US 360) is a spur route of US 60. The U.S. Highway runs  entirely within the state of Virginia from US 58 Business, Virginia State Route 293 (SR 293), and SR 360 in Danville east to SR 644 in Reedville. US 360 connects Danville, South Boston, and Keysville in Southside Virginia with the state capital of Richmond.  The U.S. Highway also connects Richmond with Tappahannock on the Middle Peninsula and the eastern Northern Neck, where the highway serves as the primary route through Northumberland County. US 360 is a four-lane divided highway for almost all of its length.

Route description

Danville to Keysville
US 360 begins at a four-way intersection on the north side of the Dan River opposite downtown Danville.  Main Street heads south across the river into downtown Danville as SR 293 and north as SR 293 and SR 360, the latter highway being the old alignment of US 360 from Danville to east of South Boston.  The west leg of the intersection is Riverside Drive, which is followed by US 58 Business.  US 360 heads east along four-lane divided River Street with US 58 Business and passes under Norfolk Southern Railway's Danville District rail line.  The highway's name changes to South Boston Highway on crossing Fall Creek and veering away from the Dan River.  US 360 reaches the eastern end of its concurrency with US 58 Business and joins with US 58 at the highway's cloverleaf interchange with US 29 (Danville Expressway).  US 360 and US 58 leave the city of Danville after passing along the north side of Danville Regional Airport.

US 360 and US 58 meet the northern end of SR 62 (Milton Highway) in eastern Pittsylvania County before entering Halifax County.  The highway's name changes to Philpott Road and it crosses the Dan River.  US 360 and US 58 pass through the hamlets of Delila, where the U.S. Highways meet the northern end of SR 119 (Calvary Road) and Turbeville before reaching the community of Riverdale on the south side of the Dan River opposite South Boston.  The U.S. Highways have a grade crossing of Norfolk Southern's Durham District rail line and intersect US 501 (Huell Matthews Highway), where the highways begin to follow Bill Tuck Highway.  A short distance east of US 501, US 360 and US 58 diverge, with the former highway turning north onto James D. Hagood Highway to cross the Dan River and Norfolk Southern's Danville–Richmond rail line.  On entering the town of South Boston, US 360 follows John Randolph Boulevard and has intersections with the eastern ends of SR 304 (Seymour Drive) and SR 34 (Hodges Street).

After leaving South Boston, US 360 becomes James D. Hagood Highway again, which heads northeast past South Boston Speedway and William M. Tuck Airport.  The U.S. Highway crosses the Banister River at Terrys Bridge and meets the coincident termini of SR 360 (Bethel Road) and SR 344 (Scottsburg Road) near Scottsburg.  US 360 crosses over the Danville–Richmond rail line and meets the western end of SR 92 (Clover Road) south of the town of Clover.  The U.S. Highway crosses the Roanoke River into Charlotte County and follows Kings Highway, which intersects SR 92 (Jeb Stuart Highway) again and US 15 (Barnesville Highway) at Wylliesburg.  US 360 and US 15 run concurrently north through Crafton Gate, where the highways intersect SR 47 (Craftons Gate Highway).  South of Keysville, at the southern end of US 15 Business and US 360 Business (Old Kings Highway), the highway becomes a freeway.  US 15 and US 360 cross over the Virginia Southern Railroad and have a partial interchange with the business routes.  Just east of the town of Keysville, the U.S. Highways have a diamond interchange with SR 40 (Lunenburg County Highway).  US 15 and US 360 pass under the Virginia Southern rail line before diverging at a partial cloverleaf interchange that also marks the northern end of their respective business routes.

Keysville to Richmond
US 360 briefly runs atop the Prince Edward – Lunenburg county line before fully entering Prince Edward County, where the highway parallels the Virginia Southern Railroad to the south and Norfolk Southern Railway's Blue Ridge District to the north.  The U.S. Highway passes through the communities of Bruceville and Meherrin, where the highway crosses to the north side of the Blue Ridge rail line.  As US 360 passes through Meherrin, the highway briefly enters into Lunenburg County before reentering Prince Edward County, although no signs mark the county line there.  US 360 begins to parallel the two rail lines at Green Bay, where the road temporarily becomes undivided.  The U.S. Highway parallels both rail lines to Burkeville, a town in the southwestern corner of Nottoway County where the highway's name changes to Patrick Henry Highway.  US 360 crosses over the Farmville Belt Line, a part of the Blue Ridge District that serves Farmville and joins the main Blue Ridge line in Burkeville.  Just north of the rail crossing, the U.S. Highway has a partial cloverleaf interchange with US 460 (Colonial Trail Highway) and US 360 Business and US 460 Business, which parallel the rail line into town as 2nd Street.  US 360 and US 460 bypass the town to the north and receive the eastern end of their respective business routes before diverging at a partial interchange.  There is no direct access from westbound US 360 to eastbound US 460 or from westbound US 460 to eastbound US 360; those movements are made via SR 723 (Lewiston Plank Road) or SR 49 (Watson Wood Rd).

US 360 parallels Norfolk Southern's Richmond District rail line northeast from Burkeville.  The highway meets the northern end of SR 49 (Watsons Wood Road) before entering Amelia County.  West of Jetersville, the highway intersects the eastern end of SR 307 (Holly Farms Road), which connects to US 460 northwest of Burkeville.  US 360 continues to Amelia Court House, which is directly served by US 360 Business (Goodes Bridge Road).  North of the county seat, the U.S. Highway crosses the rail line and has a partial cloverleaf interchange with its business route before receiving the northern end of the business route west of Winterham, where the highway and railroad diverge.  US 360 has a junction with SR 153 (Military Road) between Winterham and the Appomattox River, where the highway enters Chesterfield County.  US 360 becomes Hull Street Road and passes through the village of Skinquarter before entering the suburban area surrounding Richmond.  The U.S. Highway expands to eight lanes through Woodlake and crosses Swift Creek just downstream from the dam that holds back Swift Creek Reservoir west of the highway's cloverleaf interchange with SR 288.

US 360 continues northeast as a six-lane highway through more suburban areas before its partial cloverleaf interchange with SR 150 (Chippenham Parkway), where the U.S. Highway enters the city of Richmond and reduces to four lanes.  The U.S. Highway crosses CSX's North End Subdivision and becomes Hull Street at its intersection with SR 161 (Belt Boulevard).  US 360 heads into the Manchester section of Richmond as a four-lane undivided highway that has intersections with SR 10 (Broad Rock Road), Midlothian Turnpike, and US 1 and US 301, which head south toward Petersburg as Jefferson Davis Highway and north toward their James River crossing as Cowardin Street.  US 360 passes the Art Works artist colony before passing over Norfolk Southern  crossing the James River on the Mayo Bridge, which crosses Mayo Island in the middle of the river.  US 360 reaches the north side of the river just west of the Triple Crossing; the highway passes under the east–west viaduct of CSX's Rivanna Subdivision and has a grade crossing of Norfolk Southern's Richmond District.   The U.S. Highway passes under SR 195 (Downtown Expressway) follows 14th Street into the Shockoe Bottom neighborhood, where US 360 turns east onto Main Street, which carries US 60 and the GRTC Pulse bus rapid transit line. The two highways pass under I-95 (Richmond–Petersburg Turnpike) and CSX's Bellwood Subdivision and by the Main Street Station serving Amtrak's Northeast Regional trains during their four-block concurrency.

Richmond to Reedville

US 360 turns northeast onto 18th Street at Mason's Hall to pass along the west edge of the Church Hill neighborhood.  At Grace Street, the highway splits into a one-way pair; westbound US 360 follows 17th Street.  The U.S. Highway meets the eastern end of US 250 (Broad Street), then curves north and passes under the Leigh Street Viaduct, which carries SR 33.  The two directions of US 360 come together one block before the highway turns east onto Fairfield Way.  The U.S. Highway turns north onto four-lane undivided Mechanicsville Turnpike and has a partial cloverleaf interchange with I-64 before exiting the city of Richmond as a six-lane divided highway.  US 360 passes through the Henrico County community of East Highland Park, where the highway intersects Laburnum Avenue, which leads to Richmond Raceway.  The U.S. Highway crosses the Chickahominy River into Hanover County, where the highway reduces to four lanes at the southern end of Mechanicsville's US 360 Business.  While on the Mechanicsville Bypass, US 360 has a diamond interchange with SR 156 (Cold Harbor Road).  The movement from westbound US 360 to SR 156 is provided at the northern end of the bypass, which occurs a short distance south of US 360's cloverleaf interchange with I-295.

Northeast of I-295, US 360 gradually transitions from suburban to rural surroundings.  The transition is complete by the time the U.S. Highway crosses the Pamunkey River into King William County, where the highway's name changes to Richmond–Tappahannock Highway.  US 360 passes through Manquin and Central Garage, where the highway intersects SR 30 (King William Road).  At Aylett, the site of Zoar State Forest, the U.S. Highway crosses the Mattaponi River into King and Queen County, where the highway meets the western end of SR 14 at the community of St. Stephens Church.  US 360 enters Essex County at Miller's Tavern where the highway crosses the watershed divide between the York River tributaries and the Rappahannock River.  The U.S. Highway is named Richmond Highway northeast past Tappahannock-Essex County Airport to Brays Fork, where the highway meets US 17 (Tidewater Trail) at a directional intersection.  The U.S. Highways run concurrently into the town of Tappahannock.  Within the town, US 17 and US 360 cross Hoskins Creek and become a four-lane undivided highway.  On the north side of the downtown area, US 360 turns east onto two-lane Queen Street and crosses the Rappahannock River on a high-level two-lane bridge.

US 360 expands to a four-lane divided highway on arriving in Richmond County.  The U.S. Highway heads east as Richmond Road past the historic plantation Mount Airy to the town of Warsaw.  In the center of town, through which US 360 is an undivided highway, the highway runs concurrently with SR 3 Business from Main Street to SR 3 (Historyland Highway).  US 360 expands to a divided highway at the hamlet of Indian Field and passes through Haynesville before entering Northumberland County at Village.  The U.S. Highway veers northeast at Luttrellville and meets the eastern end of SR 202 (Hampton Hall Road) in Callao.  At SR 202, US 360 turns east onto Northumberland Highway, which is two lanes within the unincorporated village.  The U.S. Highway briefly expands to a four-lane divided highway but is two lanes through Lottsburg.  US 360 has another divided highway section before reducing to two lanes through Heathsville, where the highway passes St. Stephen's Episcopal Church and intersects SR 201 (Courthouse Road).  The highway passes through Claraville, Horse Head, and Downings Corner before reaching its junction with SR 200 (Jesse DuPont Memorial Highway) at Burgess.  US 360 has its final four-lane divided section between Folly and Lilian.  At Beverlyville, the U.S. Highway curves south toward Reedville.  At SR 657 (Fleeton Road), the U.S. Highway follows Main Street south to its eastern terminus at the intersection of Main Street and Reed Avenue, which are both part of SR 644.

Major intersections

Special routes

Keysville business route

U.S. Route 360 Business (US 360 Business) is a business route of US 360 in Charlotte County.  The highway, which runs  between junctions with US 360 and US 15 south and north of Keysville, is entirely concurrent with US 15 Business.

Burkeville business route

U.S. Route 360/460 Business (US 360/460 Bus.) is a shared business route of US 360 and US 460 in Nottoway County.  The highway runs  between junctions with US 360 and US 460 west and east of Burkeville.  US 360/460 Business begins at the partial cloverleaf interchange where the two highways begin to run concurrently west of Burkeville.  There is no direct access from the westbound bypass to the eastbound business routes.  The business routes pass through the town as 2nd Street before rejoining US 360 and US 460 a short distance west of their eastern divergence point.

Amelia Court House business route

U.S. Route 360 Business (US 360 Business) is a business route of US 360 in Amelia County.  The highway runs  between junctions with US 360 west and north of Amelia Court House.  US 360 Business follows Goodes Bridge Road parallel to Norfolk Southern Railway's Richmond District along the northwest side of the village center, where the highway meets the western end of SR 38 (Virginia Street).  North of the village, the business route has a partial cloverleaf interchange with US 360 before reaching its northern terminus at the mainline U.S. Highway.

Mechanicsville business route

U.S. Route 360 Business (US 360 Business) is a business route of US 360 in Hanover County.  The highway runs  between junctions with US 360 west and east of Mechanicsville.  The business route begins as a one-way westbound ramp to westbound US 360.  US 360 Business gains an eastbound lane and heads east as Mechanicsville Turnpike to an intersection with SR 156 (Cold Harbor Road) and SR 638 (Atlee Road).  The business route continues a few more blocks before again becoming a one-way westbound ramp from westbound US 360.  This westbound ramp is used to access SR 156 from westbound US 360 because there is no direct ramp in US 360's diamond interchange with SR 156.

References

External links

Virginia Highways Project: US 360
 Endpoints of U.S. Highway 360

60-3
60-3
U.S. Route 360
U.S. Route 360
U.S. Route 360
U.S. Route 360
U.S. Route 360
U.S. Route 360
U.S. Route 360
U.S. Route 360
U.S. Route 360
U.S. Route 360
U.S. Route 360
U.S. Route 360
U.S. Route 360
U.S. Route 360
U.S. Route 360
U.S. Route 360
3
Virginia Byways